Antonio R. Frausto (1897–1954) was a Mexican film actor. A leading character actor he became a familiar face during the Golden age of Mexican cinema, appearing more than ninety films. He played the nineteenth century dictator of Mexico Porfirio Díaz on screen several times.

Selected filmography
 Let's Go with Pancho Villa (1936)
 Such Is My Country (1937)
 Beautiful Mexico (1938)
 The Coward (1939)
 Narciso's Hard Luck (1940)
 Doña Bárbara (1943)
 My Memories of Mexico (1944)
 The Escape (1944)
 The Hour of Truth (1945)
 Tragic Wedding (1946)
 Midnight (1949)
 Over the Waves (1950)
 María Montecristo (1951)
 Now I Am Rich (1952)

References

Bibliography
 Mora, Carl J. Mexican Cinema: Reflections of a Society, 1896-2004. McFarland, 2005.

External links

1897 births
1954 deaths
Mexican male film actors
Male actors from San Luis Potosí
20th-century Mexican male actors
People from San Luis Potosí City